Kaptan may refer to:

Kapudan Pasha (modern Turkish: Kaptan Paşa), were the titles given to the chief commander of the navy in the Ottoman Empire
Cihan Kaptan, Turkish-German footballer
Kaptan, supreme deity of the Visayan peoples in central Philippines; see Philippine mythology

Turkish-language surnames